Todd Boeckman (born June 8, 1984) is a former American football quarterback. He was signed by the Jaguars as an undrafted free agent on June 17, 2009. He played college football at Ohio State University.

College career
Boeckman was recruited in 2002, but redshirted and grayshirted, extending his stay with Ohio State for two more seasons. After Heisman Trophy winner Troy Smith graduated after the 2006 season, Boeckman beat out fellow quarterbacks Rob Schoenhoft and Antonio Henton for the starting job. In 2007, he passed for 2,375 yards and 25 touchdowns and was named first-team Big Ten. He also led the Buckeyes to the BCS National Championship Game on January 7, 2008. He threw for 208 yards, two touchdowns, and two interceptions as the Buckeyes fell to the LSU Tigers 38–24.

Boeckman entered the 2008 season as a 6th year Senior. He was named the starter for the 2008 season, however after losing 35–3 in the  2008 USC game, he lost the starting job to Terrelle Pryor. In the 2009 Fiesta Bowl against the University of Texas, Boeckman threw a touchdown pass to Terrelle Pryor.

Statistics

Professional career
Boeckman was invited to try out for the Cincinnati Bengals during their rookie mini camp, which concluded on May 3, 2009. Boeckman was among the tryout players not offered a free agent contract. Although Boeckman had a good workout with the Bengals, head coach Marvin Lewis stated that there were already four other quarterbacks on the roster, making it more difficult for Boeckman to land a contract. He also tried out for the Atlanta Falcons.

Jacksonville Jaguars
Boeckman was signed by the Jacksonville Jaguars on June 17, 2009. He was waived by the Jaguars on July 31 to make room on the roster for rookie third-round pick Terrance Knighton. He was re-signed on August 30 after the team waived Paul Smith. He was then cut on September 5, during final cuts.

References

1984 births
Living people
American football quarterbacks
Jacksonville Jaguars players
Ohio State Buckeyes football players
People from St. Henry, Ohio
Players of American football from Ohio